Armand Laurienté (born 4 December 1998) is a French professional footballer who plays as a forward or a left winger for Italian  club Sassuolo.

Club career
On 23 July 2018, Laurienté signed his first professional contract with Rennes and immediately went on loan to Orléans in Ligue 2. He made his professional debut with the club in a 2–0 league loss to Lens on 27 July 2018. Laurienté returned to Rennes in January 2019.

On 31 August 2022, Laurienté signed with Sassuolo in Italy.

International career 
Laurienté is a France youth international.

Personal life
Born in France, Laurienté is of Guadeloupean descent.

Career statistics

Club

References

External links
 France profile at FFF
 
 
 Lorient profile

1998 births
Living people
People from Gonesse
Footballers from Val-d'Oise
Association football forwards
French footballers
France under-21 international footballers
French people of Guadeloupean descent
Red Star F.C. players
Stade Rennais F.C. players
US Orléans players
INF Clairefontaine players
FC Lorient players
U.S. Sassuolo Calcio players
Ligue 1 players
Ligue 2 players
Championnat National 2 players
Championnat National 3 players
French expatriate footballers
Expatriate footballers in Italy
French expatriate sportspeople in Italy